Tazim Wajid Wajed (born James Timothy Watson Jr.; August 13, 1970) is a former American football safety in the National Football League (NFL). He played professionally for the Kansas City Chiefs, the New York Giants, and the Philadelphia Eagles.

Early life
Watson was born in Fort Valley, Georgia. He was a three-sport athlete in high school, lettering in football, basketball, and track. An All-Middle Georgia selection following his senior football season, Watson graduated with honors from Peach County High School.

College career
Watson played college football at Howard University. He holds the record for blocked kicks at Howard, with seven. He has the distinction of being the first athlete in the history of the school to be named to the GTE Academic All-America Team (1992).

Watson earned a bachelor's degree cum laude in fashion merchandising and business marketing, then completed post-graduate studies in athletic administration. In 1992 he became a member of Omega Psi Phi fraternity. Most recently, Watson was inducted into the Howard University Athletic Hall of Fame, class of 2005.

Professional career
Watson was drafted by the Green Bay Packers in the 6th round (156th overall) of the 1993 NFL Draft. He later played for the Kansas City Chiefs, New York Giants, and Philadelphia Eagles. He also played in the World League of American Football for the Barcelona Dragons and the Arena Football League for the Arizona Rattlers.

Life after the NFL
In 2018 Watson officially changed his legal name to Tazim Wajid Wajed.  He is currently retired, and supports the professional pursuits of his wife and children.  During his post football playing career, he has been an assistant football coach in NFL Europe with the Rhine Fire and Scottish Claymores, an NFL Coaching Fellowship Participant with the New Orleans Saints, a financial professional, fitness trainer, lifestyle coach, and motivational speaker. He is an accomplished public speaker and author, and serves as Founding Chair of UPLIFT Community Fellowship, a philanthropic charitable community service organization in Columbus, Georgia.

He remains active in his local community through charitable work via involvement with his fraternities (the Diplomats Fraternity, Inc. and Omega Psi Phi, Inc.), the NFL Alumni Association, and his family’s personal philanthropic organization UPLIFT Community Fellowship, Inc., which provides food and toys annually to families in need during the Thanksgiving and Christmas holidays. Tazim sponsors youth football and basketball programs, instructs youth sports camps, and conducts life-skills seminars for young students and scholar-athletes.

Wajed is married to wife Lisa, and is the father of five children: Tré, Alexus, Christian, and twins Aubrey and Bella. Tré and Christian followed in their father's footsteps playing professional football. Tré signed as an UDFA with the Miami Dolphins in 2019, spent a season in the XFL with the Dallas Renegades, 2 in the CFL with the Montréal Alouettes and Edmonton Elks, and currently plays with the St. Louis Battlehawks of the XFL.  Christian plays wide receiver, and was drafted by the Packers in the 2022 NFL Draft.

See also
 List of Kansas City Chiefs players
 List of New York Giants players
 List of Philadelphia Eagles players

References

 http://www.blogtalkradio.com/hardhittingsportstalk
 http://staff.sportsblog.com/posts/10237010/congratulations-to-the-winners-of-december-s-pro-leaderboard-.html

External links
 Pro-Football-Reference.com
 NFL stats
 AFL stats

1970 births
Living people
People from Fort Valley, Georgia
American football safeties
Howard Bison football players
Kansas City Chiefs players
New York Giants players
Philadelphia Eagles players
Barcelona Dragons players
Arizona Rattlers players
Scottish Claymores coaches